Florida's Domestic Marijuana Eradication Program (FL DME), is a multi-agency state and federal law enforcement program founded in 1981, jointly managed by the Drug Enforcement Administration and the Florida Department of Agriculture and Consumer Services to provide funding for local law enforcement agencies’ efforts to eradicate illegal cannabis cultivation and trafficking in Florida.

The program, formed in 1981, includes the Drug Enforcement Administration, the Florida Department of Agriculture and Consumer Services' Office of Agricultural Law Enforcement, and 45 sheriff's and police departments across Florida.

See also
War on Drugs
Office of National Drug Control Policy
Domestic Cannabis Eradication/Suppression Program

References

External links
Florida’s Domestic Marijuana Eradication Program

Cannabis cultivation
Florida law
1981 in cannabis
Organizations established in 1981
1981 establishments in Florida
Cannabis in Florida
Anti-cannabis operations
Cannabis eradication